The Cheran Superfast Express is an overnight Super Fast Express train in India which runs daily between Coimbatore Junction and Chennai Central via Salem Jn on the Southern Railway zone of the Indian Railways.

History 
It was inaugurated on Jul 05, 1984 as a day train between Coimbatore Junction and Madras Central, with Air-Conditioned Chair Car and Second Class Sitting coaches to run opposite Kovai Express was changed to run night time with Sleeper Coaches. At present, Coimbatore–Chennai Central Intercity is running in the old schedule of Cheran express

Numbering 
Train Number 12673 runs from Chennai Central to Coimbatore Junction while 12674 runs from Coimbatore Junction to Chennai Central. The Cheran Express began to run with LHB coaches from 10 November 2017.

Coach Position 
With the introduction of LHB coaches to Cheran Superfast Express, it has the following coach position:
 1 AC First Class
 1 AC Two Tier
 6 AC Three Tier
 9 Sleeper Class
 3 General Unreserved
 1 End On Generator
 1 Luggage Cum LHB Brake Vans

This train shares its rake with Thiruvananthapuram Mail

Loco Links 
The train is hauled by WAP 7 locomotive on its entire route.

Route 

The train starts from Coimbatore at 22.50 hours and reaches Chennai at 07.00 hours the next day.
In the return direction it leaves Chennai at 22.10 hours and reaches Coimbatore at 06.05 hours. The train stops at Tiruppur, Erode Junction, Salem Junction, Jolarpettai Junction and Arakkonam Junction . In the return direction (from Chennai), it also stops at the Coimbatore North Junction.

Incidents 
In 2005, an unknown person was killed in a fire inside a toilet on the train.

In 2007, five coaches of the train derailed near Ambur due to a lower bearing failure resulting in ten passengers getting injured.

See also
Tamil Nadu Express
Chennai Rajdhani
Nellai Express
Coimbatore Shatabdi Express
Pallavan Express
Vaigai express
Rockfort Express
Kovai Express
Pandian Express
Pearl City Express
Uzhavan Express

References 

Transport in Chennai
Named passenger trains of India
Express trains in India
Transport in Coimbatore
Rail transport in Tamil Nadu